Brackley Lough or Lough Brackley is a lake in County Cavan, Ireland, found to the west of the N87. It feeds into the River Blackwater, County Cavan.

Wildlife

Brackley Lough is a pike, roach and bream fishery.

See also 
 List of loughs in Ireland

References 

Lakes of County Cavan